Pindarev Island is the 250 m long in southeast-northwest direction and 115 m wide flat rocky island in Nishava Cove separated from the north coast of Rugged Island in the South Shetland Islands by a 35 m wide passage. Its surface area is 1.9 ha. The area was visited by early 19th century sealers.

The feature is named after the Bulgarian cartoonist Tenyu Pindarev (1921–2010), for his contribution to the promotion of Antarctica.

Location
Detailed Spanish mapping in 1992, and Bulgarian mapping in 2009 and 2017.

Maps
 Península Byers, Isla Livingston. Mapa topográfico a escala 1:25000. Madrid: Servicio Geográfico del Ejército, 1992
 L. Ivanov. Antarctica: Livingston Island and Greenwich, Robert, Snow and Smith Islands. Scale 1:120000 topographic map. Troyan: Manfred Wörner Foundation, 2010.  (First edition 2009. )
 L. Ivanov. Antarctica: Livingston Island and Smith Island. Scale 1:100000 topographic map. Manfred Wörner Foundation, 2017. 
 Antarctic Digital Database (ADD). Scale 1:250000 topographic map of Antarctica. Scientific Committee on Antarctic Research (SCAR). Since 1993, regularly upgraded and updated

See also
 List of Antarctic and subantarctic islands

Notes

References
 Pindarev Island. SCAR Composite Gazetteer of Antarctica
 Bulgarian Antarctic Gazetteer. Antarctic Place-names Commission. (details in Bulgarian, basic data in English)

External links
 Pindarev Island. Adjusted Copernix satellite image

Islands of the South Shetland Islands
Bulgaria and the Antarctic